The 1927 Birthday Honours were appointments by King George V to various orders and honours to reward and highlight good works by citizens of the British Empire. The appointments were made to celebrate the official birthday of The King, and were published in The London Gazette on 3 June 1927.

The recipients of honours are displayed here as they were styled before their new honour, and arranged by honour, with classes (Knight, Knight Grand Cross, etc.) and then divisions (Military, Civil, etc.) as appropriate.

United Kingdom and British Empire

Baron
Sir Davison Alexander Dalziel  by the name, style and title of Baron Dalziel of Wooler, of Wooler in the County of Northumberland. Member of Parliament for Brixton division 1910-28 and since 1924. For political and public services.
Sir Gilbert Greenall  by the name, style and title of Baron Daresbury, of Walton, in the County of Chester. For political and public services.

Privy Councillor
The King appointed the following to His Majesty's Most Honourable Privy Council:
Lieutenant-Colonel the Hon. George Frederick Stanley  Member of Parliament for Preston 1910-22 and for Willesden East since October, 1924, Parliamentary Secretary to the Ministry of Pensions since November, 1924. Comptroller of H.M. Household 1919-21; Financial Secretary to the War Office, 1921-22. Under Secretary of State for Home Affairs November 1922 to March 1923.

Baronetcies
Sir John Brickwood. For political and public services in Portsmouth.
Lieutenant Commander Geoffrey Cecil Congreve  son of the late Governor and Commander-in-Chief, Malta
Ernest Craig  Member of Parliament for the Crewe division, 1912–1918 and since 1924
Sir William Henry Neville Goschen  For public services.
Reginald James Neville Neville  Member of Parliament for Wigan, 1910–1918 and Norfolk East since 1924; Recorder of Bury St. Edmunds since 1905
Sir Harry Benedetto Renwick  For political and public services in connection with electricity schemes.

Knight Bachelor

Richard John Allison  Principal Architect to H.M. Office of Works
Augustus Gordon Grant Asher  County Clerk of Midlothian; Secretary of the Association of County Councils in Scotland
Henry Edward Barker, For public services in Alexandria.
Thomas James Barnes  Solicitor to the Board of Trade
George Albert Bonner, King's Remembrancer and Senior Master of the Supreme Court
William Burrell  For public and political work and services to Art in Scotland.
James Frederick Cleaver, For public services in Northern Ireland.
Charles Clegg  Chairman, Sheffield Local Employment Committee. For services to the Board of Trade and Ministry of Labour.
Alderman James Crooks  For political and public services in Lancashire. President of the Conservative Party in St. Helen's since 1918
Leybourne Francis Watson Davidson. For services in connection with Empire Settlement.
Arthur George Dilley  For political and public services in Huntingdonshire. Chairman of Huntingdonshire Conservative Association
Edwin Evans (Politician)  For political and public services in Battersea
William Claude Fawcett, Chairman of the Cleveland Conservative and Unionist Association. For political and public services in Yorkshire.
Lieutenant-Colonel Arthur George Ferguson  H.M. Inspector of Constabulary for Scotland
Thomas Edwards Forster  For political and public services in Middlesex. Chairman of the Chiswick Conservative Association for 15 years
John Haslam  For political and public services in Lancashire.
Lieutenant-Colonel Vivian Leonard Henderson  Member of Parliament for Glasgow, Tradeston division, December, 1918–22, and for Bootle since 1924
William George Lobjoit  late Controller of Horticulture, Ministry of Agriculture. For public services.
Thomas James Leigh Maclachlan, Chief Organising Agent of the Conservative and Unionist Party, 1922-26. Principal Agent of the Conservative and Unionist Party, 1927
John Larking, For philanthropic services.
Charles James Martin  Director of the Lister Institute in London
Henry Mechan. For political, public and philanthropic services in the west of Scotland
Martin John Melvin, For political, public and philanthropic services in Birmingham.
John Robert Pakeman  Past Chief Commoner of the City of London
His Honour Judge Edward Abbott Parry  late County Court Judge
John Prosser  Crown Agent in Scotland
Alderman Walter Raine  Chairman of Section "B" of the Local Legislation Committee. Member of Sunderland Town Council since 1902
John Houldsworth Shaw, Solicitor to the Board of Inland Revenue
Alderman James Benjamin Slade  For political and public services in Leyton.
William Calthrop Thorne  Honorary Secretary to the Dock and Harbour Authorities Association

Dominions
Lieutenant-Colonel Louis Edward Barnett  Professor of Surgery, Otago University, Dominion of New Zealand
John Abraham Jacob de Villiers  In recognition of services to the Government of Newfoundland.
George Herbert Duckworth  Chairman of the Irish Sailors and Soldiers Land Trust
The Hon. Apirana Turupa Ngata, Member of the House of Representatives and formerly Member of the Executive Council, Dominion of New Zealand

British India
James Donald  Indian Civil Service, Vice President of the Executive Council, Bengal
Justice Charles Gordon Hill Fawcett, Indian Civil Service, Puisne Judge, High Court of Judicature, Bombay
Justice Zahhadur Rahim Zahid Suhrawardy, Puisne Judge, High Court of Judicature, Calcutta
Manmohandas Ramji Vora, Member of the Council of State
Sultan Ahmad, Vice-Chancellor of the Patna University
Padamji Pestonji Ginwala, Member and Acting President of the Indian Tariff Board
Francis Colomb Crawford  Imperial Police (retired), lately Director-General of Police, His Exalted Highness the Nizam's Government, Hyderabad (Deccan)
Khan Bahadur Sheikh Abdul Qadir, Member of the Punjab Legislative Council
Thomas Mackenzie Ross, lately Chairman, Madras Chamber of Commerce
David Elias David Ezra, late Sheriff of Calcutta
Sorabjr Bezonji Mehta  Manager, Empress Mills, Nagpur
U Po Tha  Honorary Magistrate, Rangoon

Colonies, Protectorates, etc
Edmund Davis, in recognition of his services in connection with the development of the mineral resources of the Empire. 
Anthony de Freitas  Chief Justice of British Guiana
Aubrey Gregor Graham, Chief Construction Engineer, and Divisional Superintendent, Transportation Department, Government Railways, Nigeria
Ugo Pasquale Mifsud  Head of the Ministry and Minister for the Treasury, Malta
Hippolyte Louis Wiehe du Coudray Souchon  In recognition of his services to Mauritius.

The Most Honourable Order of the Bath

Knight Grand Cross of the Order of the Bath (GCB)

Military Division
Royal Navy
Admiral Sir Arthur Cavenagh Leveson  First and Principal Naval Aide-de-Camp to The King

Civil Division
Alexander Albert, Marquess of Carisbrooke

Knight Commander of the Order of the Bath (KCB)

Military Division
Royal Navy
Vice-Admiral the Hon. Sir Hubert George Brand 

Army
Major-General George McKenzie Franks  General Officer Commanding, United Provinces District, India
Major-General John Ponsonby  Colonel, The Suffolk Regiment, late General Officer Commanding, Madras District, India
Major-General Robert Archibald Cassels  Indian Army, General Officer Commanding, Peshawar District, India
Major-General John Henry Keith Stewart  Indian Army, General Officer Commanding, Aden Independent Brigade, and Political Resident, Aden

Royal Air Force
Air Vice-Marshal Henry Robert Moore Brooke-Popham

Civil Division

Sir William George Tyrrell  Permanent Under Secretary of State for Foreign Affairs
Brigadier-General Sir Samuel Herbert Wilson  Permanent Under Secretary of State for the Colonies

Companion of the Order of the Bath (CB)

Military Division
Royal Navy
Rear-Admiral William Douglas Paton  
Engineer Rear-Admiral James Palmer Leahy 
Captain Edward Astley-Bushton 
Paymaster-Captain William Ernest Crocker  
Captain Henry Douglas King 

Army
Major-General John Macfarlane Sloan  late Royal Medical Corps, Deputy Director of Medical Services, Southern Command, India
Colonel Herbert Cecil Potter  Brigade Commander, 3rd Indian Infantry Brigade, India
Colonel Francis Adrian Wilson  Colonel, Royal Artillery, Eastern Command
Colonel Edward Barnard Hankey  Brigade Commander, 12th Infantry Brigade
Colonel Harry Biddulph  late Chief Engineer, Northern Command
Colonel John Harington  Inspector General of The King's African Rifles
Major-General Richard Stukeley St. John  Indian Army, Deputy Adjutant and Quartermaster General, Northern Command, India
Colonel Percy Langdon Beddy  Indian Army, Brigade Commander, 6th Indian Infantry Brigade, India
Colonel Wilfrith Gerald Key Green  Indian Army, Brigade Commander, 1st Indian Cavalry Brigade, India

Civil Division

Frederick Carl Bovenschen  Assistant Secretary, War Office
Frederick Phillips, Assistant Secretary, H.M. Treasury
Eustace Beverley Shine, Assistant Secretary, Ministry of Agriculture and Fisheries 
Robert Gilbert Vansittart  Counsellor in the Foreign Office
Frederick Rowland Williams Wynn, Principal Clerk, Committee and Private Bill Office, House of Commons

Order of Merit (OM)

The Hon. Sir Charles Algernon Parsons  In recognition of his eminent services in scientific research and its application to industries.

The Most Exalted Order of the Star of India

Knight Commander (KCSI)

Khan Bahadur Sir Muhammad Habibullah, Sahib Bahadur  Member of the Governor-General's Executive Council

Companion (CSI)
Lieutenant-Colonel Michael Lloyd Ferrar  Chief Commissioner, Andaman and Nicobar Islands

The Most Distinguished Order of Saint Michael and Saint George

Knight Grand Cross of the Order of St Michael and St George (GCMG)

Sir William Lamond Allardyce  Governor and Commander-in-Chief of Newfoundland
Lieutenant-General Sir Robert Stephenson Smyth Baden-Powell 
His Highness Charles Vyner Brooke, Rajah of Sarawak
The Rt. Hon. Sir John Anthony Cecil Tilley  His Majesty's Ambassador Extraordinary and Plenipotentiary at Tokyo

Knight Commander of the Order of St Michael and St George (KCMG)

Alwin Robinson Dickinson  United Kingdom Member of the British Phosphate Commission
William Charles Fleming Robertson  Governor and Commander-in-Chief of the Island of Barbados
Sir Herbert Nicholls  Lieutenant-Governor and Chief Justice of the Supreme Court, State of Tasmania

Honorary Knight Commander
His Highness the Amir Abdullah  of Trans-Jordan

Companion of the Order of St Michael and St George (CMG)
John Fitzgerald Brenan, Acting British Consul-General at Canton
Alan Cuthbert Burns, Colonial Secretary, Bahama Islands
Henry Grattan Bushe, Assistant Legal Adviser, Colonial Office
Professor Robert William Chapman, of the University of Adelaide, President of the Astronomical Society and of other institutions in the State of South Australia
Joseph Robert Cahill, Commercial Counsellor at His Majesty's Embassy at Paris
John Thomas Collins  Parliamentary Draughtsman, State of Victoria
Captain Gilbert Joseph Cullen Dyett, Federal President of the Returned Sailors and Soldiers Imperial League of Australia
George Lewis Hollingsworth Hughes. Chief Inspector of Parquet; Egyptian Ministry of Justice
Major John Morton Fremantle  Senior Resident, Nigeria
Harold Alfred MacMichael  Civil Secretary, Sudan Government
The Hon. Howard Unwin Moffat, Minister of Mines and Public Works, Southern Rhodesia
Owen St. Clair O'Malley, Acting Counsellor at His Majesty's legation at Peking
Eric Clare Edmund Phipps  His Majesty's Minister Plenipotentiary at Paris
Edward Hugh Dyneley Nicolls  Director of Public Works, Gold Coast Colony
Wilfrid Thomas Southorn, Colonial Secretary, Hong Kong
John Christian Ramsay Sturrock, Resident Commissioner, Basutoland
Eric Teichman  Chinese Counsellor at His Majesty's Legation at Peking
Robert Neimann Thaine, Government Agent, Western Province, Ceylon
Henry Wagstaffe Thomson, British Resident, Perak, Federated Malay States
Arthur Francis Holme Wiggin, First Secretary at His Majesty's Residency at Cairo
Charles John FitzRoy Rhys Wingfield, Counsellor at His Majesty's Embassy at Rome

The Most Eminent Order of the Indian Empire

Knight Commander (KCIE)
Frederick William Johnston  Indian Civil Service, Agent to the Governor-General and Chief Commissioner, Baluchistan
Cowasji Jehangir  Member of the Executive Council, Bombay

Companion (CIE)
John Hugh Ronald Fraser  Indian Civil Service, Judicial Commissioner, North-West Frontier Province
Lieutenant-Colonel John Cyril Holdich Leicester, Indian Medical Service, lately Officiating Surgeon-General to the Government of Bengal
Charles William Charteris Carson  Controller, Civil Accounts, India
Jnanendra Nath Gupta  Indian Civil Service, Commissioner, Presidency Division, Bengal
Geoffrey Ewart Soames, Indian Civil Service, Chief Secretary to the Government of Assam
Henry Crawford Liddell, Indian Civil Service, Superintendent and Remembrancer of Legal Affairs, and Judicial Secretary to the Government of Bengal
Arthur George Edie, Chief Conservator of Forests, Bombay
Joseph Benjamin George Smith, Officiating Chief Engineer, Public Works Department, Irrigation Branch, Punjab
Digby Livingstone Drake-Brockman, Indian Civil Service, Revenue Member, State Council, Jodhpur, Rajputana
David Macfarlane Stewart, Indian Civil Service, Provincial Training Officer, Moradabad, United Provinces
Richard'Littlehailes, Director of Public Instruction, Madras
John Alfred Baker, Chief Engineer, Public Works Department (Buildings and Roads), Central Provinces
Lieutenant-Colonel Roderick William Macdonald  Indian Army, Inspector-General of Police, Burma
Charles Stanley Whitworth, Chief Mining Engineer to Railway Board, Bengal
Arthur Beecham Briggs, Superintending Engineer, United Provinces
Lieutenant-Colonel Leopold d'Estreville Lenfestey, Indian Army Ordnance Corps, Superintendent, Rifle Factory, Ishapore, Bengal
John Elliot Armstrong  lately Deputy Inspector-General of Police, Bengal, and now Director-General of Police, His Exalted Highness The Nizam's Government, Hyderabad (Deccan). Reginald John Hirst, Deputy Inspector-General of Police, Bihar and Orissa
Frank Priestly Vincent Gompertz, Director of Revenue Survey, Madras
Major Alfred Geddes Tresidder, Indian Medical Service, Surgeon to His Excellency the Governor of Bombay
Captain (temporary Major) Arthur Friedrich Rawson Lumby  Indian Army, General Staff Officer, 2nd Grade, Army Headquarters, lately Secretary to the Indian Sandhurst Committee
Percy Lancelot Orde, Senior Superintendent of Police, Delhi
Bad Bahadur Janak Singh, Bahadur, Major-General in the Kashmir State Forces, Revenue Member of the Executive Council and Army Minister, Jammu and Kashmir State
Diwan Bahadur Thakorram Kapilram, Mehta, Government Pleader and Chairman, Committee of Management, Surat, Bombay Presidency

Imperial Order of the Crown of India
Pamela, Countess of Lytton

The Royal Victorian Order

Knight Grand Cross of the Royal Victorian Order (GCVO)
The Rt. Hon. Edward Arthur, Baron Colebrooke 
The Rt. Hon. Amelius Richard Mark, Baron Lambourne

Knight Commander of the Royal Victorian Order (KCVO)
George Francis Hugh, Earl of Eltham
Sir Francis Bernard Dicksee 
Harry Lloyd-Verney 
Edward Farquhar Buzzard

Commander of the Royal Victorian Order (CVO)
Brigadier-General Montagu Grant Wilkinson  (dated 28 March 1927)
Colonel Wilford Neville Lloyd 
Brigadier-General John Cecil Wray 
Lieutenant-Colonel Henry Walter George Cole 
Henry Linnington Martyn

Member of the Royal Victorian Order, 4th class (MVO)
Major Charles Alfred Lowry Howard 
Lieutenant-Colonel Frederick Edward Packe 
Colonel Edward George Keppel
Donald Alexander Matheson

Member of the Royal Victorian Order, 5th class (MVO)
Herbert Ryle 
Thomas Hay
David Robert
Craig Tennant

The Most Excellent Order of the British Empire

Dame Grand Cross of the Order of the British Empire (GBE)

Her Royal Highness Princess Victoria Alexandra Alice Mary, Viscountess Lascelles
Dame Nellie Melba  recognition of services to the Commonwealth of Australia

Knight Grand Cross of the Order of the British Empire (GBE)

Civil Division
Sir Henry Frank Heath  late Secretary to the Department of Scientific and Industrial Research
Lieutenant-Colonel the Rt. Hon. Sir Samuel John Gurney-Hoare 
Sir Otto Ernst Niemeyer  Controller of Finance, H.M. Treasury
Sir Richard Threlfall  For public services.
The Right Honourable Edward Hilton Young  Chairman of the Royal Commission on Indian Currency

British India
Sir Henry Strakosch  lately Member of the Royal Commission on Indian Currency

Dame Commander of the Order of the British Empire (DBE)
Emily Penrose  late Principal of Somerville College, Oxford
Helena Violet Alice, Countess of Stradbroke  recognition of services rendered during her husband's Governorship of the State of Victoria, 1921–26
Edith Marion, Lady Antrobus, Honorary Secretary of the Overseas Nursing Association

Knight Commander of the Order of the British Empire (KBE)

Military Division
Royal Navy
Vice-Admiral Brian Herbert Fairbairn Barttelot  (retired)

Army
Major-General Herbert Fothergill Cooke  Indian Army, General Officer Commanding, Sind-Rajputana District, India
Major-General Archibald Buchanan Ritchie  British Service, General Officer Commanding, 51st (The Highland) Division, Territorial Army, Scottish Command
Lieutenant-Colonel Charlton Watson Spinks  Regular Army Reserve of Officers, Royal Artillery, Inspector General, Egyptian Army

Civil Division
Cyril Ernest Ashford  Headmaster of the Royal Naval College, Dartmouth
Lieutenant-Colonel George William Humphreys  Chief Engineer to the London County Council
Charles Haughton Rafter  Chief Constable of Birmingham
Colonel Herbert Stuart Sankey  late Remembrancer of the City of London
Kenneth Dug aid Stewart, Delegate to the Special China Tariff Conference at Peking
Ernest John Strohmenger  Accountant General, Ministry of Health
Lieutenant-Colonel Francis Dudley Williams-Drummond  For public and political services in Carmarthenshire.
Colonel Murrough John Wilson  Member of Parliament for Richmond Division of Yorkshire since December 1918. Chairman of the Navy, Army and Air Force Institutes

British India
Geoffrey Latham Corbett  Indian Civil Service, Secretary to the Government of India in the Commerce Department

Diplomatic Service and Overseas List
John Joyce Broderick  Commercial Counsellor at His Majesty's Embassy, Washington
Captain Edward Colpoys Midwinter  Controller, Sudan Government, London Office
John Hope Percival, Judicial Adviser to the Egyptian Government

Dominions
Charles Percy Barlee Clubbe  In recognition of services to the Commonwealth of Australia.
William Smith Crawford, Member of the Empire Marketing Board and Vice-Chairman of the Publicity Committee of the Board
Sir Godfrey Yeatman Lagden  in recognition of public services.
Charles Graham Waddell, in recognition of services to the Commonwealth of Australia

Colonies, Protectorates, etc
Major John Alder Burdon  Governor and Commander-in-Chief of the Colony of British Honduras
Nana Ofori Atta  Omanhene of Akim Abuakwa, Provincial Member of the Legislative Council, Gold Coast Colony
Edward Brandis Denham  Colonial Secretary, Kenya Colony
Hayes Marriott  Colonial Secretary, Straits Settlements

Commander of the Order of the British Empire (CBE)

Military Division
Royal Navy
Captain Sidney Robert Bailey 
Surgeon-Captain Alfred James Hewitt 
Commander Alexander Grant  (retired)
Engineer Captain Ernest Dickerson Sydenham, Director of Engineering, Royal Australian Navy

Army
Captain Leslie William Alexander, Regular Army Reserve of Officers, 1st King's Dragoon Guards, and local Lieutenant-Colonel Commanding lst/2nd Cavalry Regiment, Iraq Levies
Colonel Henry Edwin Boxshall, Staff for Royal Engineer Services, Chief Inspector of Works, War Office
Lieutenant-Colonel and Brevet Colonel Ian Maxwell Campbell  8th (The Argyllshire) Battalion, The Argyll and Sutherland Highlanders (Princess Louise's), Territorial Army
Lieutenant-Colonel Horace Akroyd Case  Retired Pay, Regular Army Reserve of Officers, The Dorsetshire Regiment;
Lieutenant-Colonel Commanding 6th (Tanganyika Territory) Battalion, The King's African Rifles, and Officer Commanding, Troops, Tanganyika Territory
Ordnance Mechanical Engineer, 1st Class and Colonel Percy George Davies  Royal Army Ordnance Corps, Assistant Director of Equipment and Ordnance Stores, Quartermaster-General's Department, War Office
Colonel William Bruce Dunlop  Indian Army, Director of Contracts, Master General of Supply Branch, Army Headquarters, India
The Reverend Joseph David Samuel Parry-Evans  Chaplain to the Forces, 1st Class Assistant Chaplain-General, Aldershot Command
Colonel Alan James Gordon Moir  British Service, Deputy-Adjutant and Quartermaster-General, Headquarters, Western Command, India

Royal Air Force
Joanna Margaret Cruickshank  Matron-in-Chief, Princess Mary's Royal Air Force Nursing Service
Group Captain Richard Williams  Royal Australian Air Force, in recognition of distinguished services rendered on the recent seaplane flight from Melbourne to the British Solomon Islands and back

Civil Division

Major Philip Francis Ross Anley, Chief Constable of Derbyshire
Percy Ashfield  For political and public services in Flintshire
Alexander Blair  Chief Valuer for Scotland, Board of Inland Revenue
The Reverend Thomas Burns  Chairman of Newington House, Scottish Institution for Scottish Blinded Soldiers and Sailors
Albert Edward Carlyle. For public services.
Robert Francis Cholmeley  lately Headmaster of Owen's School, Islington
George Frederick Clucas, Speaker of the House of Keys, Isle of Man
Colonel Jacynth D'Ewes FitzErcald Coke  Chief Constable of the West Riding of Yorkshire
Stanley Lewis Duff, Chairman of the Approved Societies Consultative Council
Alfred John Harding  Assistant Secretary, Colonial Office
Charles Joseph William Harris, Private Secretary to the Parliamentary Secretary to H.M. Treasury
Major George Arthur Harris  Permanent Secretary, Ministry of Home Affairs, Northern Ireland
Wilfrid Appleby Gales. For political services.
Edward Goldie Howarth, Director of Establishments, Board of Education
John Jeffrey, Secretary, Scottish Board of Health
Norman Kendal, Deputy Assistant Commissioner, Metropolitan Police
Colonel Frederick Joseph Lemon  Chief Constable of Nottinghamshire
Thomas Frederick Lister, Chairman of the British Legion
George William Buckham McLeod, Statistical Officer, Ministry of Health
George Monro  Commandant, Metropolitan Special Constabulary
George Frederick Plant, Secretary to the Oversea Settlement Committee
Alfred Theodore Vaughan Robinson, Controller of Cost Accounts, War Office
John Rogers  Deputy Director of Dockyards
Ernest William Rowntree, Assistant Secretary, Ministry of Transport
Lieutenant-Colonel Norman Gibb Scorgie  Deputy Controller of H.M. Stationery Office
James Molony Spaight  Assistant Secretary, Air Ministry
Henry Sparkes  Controller of Stores, General Post Office
Edwin Earle Stonham  Collector, Board of Customs and Excise
John William Todd  Deputy Accountant General, Ministry of Labour
Sidney Turner  Accountant General, India Office
William Reeve Wallace  Chief Clerk, Judicial Committee of the Privy Council
John Henderson Watson  Chief Constable of Bristol

British India
Raj Bahadur Shyam Narayan Singh  Member of the Legislative Assembly
Lieutenant-Colonel Edward O'Brien, Resident at Kolhapoir and Political Agent, Southern Mahratta Country States, Bombay
Major Arthur Edward Broadbent Parsons  Deputy Secretary to the Government of India in the Foreign and Political Department
Lieutenant-Colonel John Mackenzie  Military Secretary to His Excellency the Governor of Bengal
Gustav Weber Thompson, Chief Sanitary Officer to the Jharia Mines Board of Health, Bihar and Orissa

Diplomatic Service and Overseas List
Nigel George Davidson, Legal Secretary, Sudan Government
Charles Vernon Dicken, Director of Finance of the Tangier Zone
George Herbert Griffith  Deputy General Manager, Egyptian State Railways
James Alexander Jameson Fields, Manager of Anglo-Persian Oil Company
Reginald Charles Fulke Maugham, Senior Consul
Albert Martin Oppenheimer, Legal Adviser to His Majesty's Embassy, Berlin
Arthur Claude Parker  General Manager, Sudan Government Railways and Steamers
Vivian Lee Osborne Sheppard, Surveyor-General, Survey of Egypt

Dominions
The Reverend John Walter Bethune  Headmaster of the Church Grammar School Launceston, State of Tasmania
Lieutenant-Colonel Rowland Mortimer Daniel, Assistant Resident Commissioner, Bechuanaland Protectorate
Daniel James Davies, Government Analyst, Department of Public Works, Newfoundland
James Thomas Heathershaw, Secretary to the Treasury, Commonwealth of Australia
Thomas William King, General Manager, Haymarket Stores; in recognition of services in connection with the marketing of Empire produce.
George Jerningham Little, Private Secretary to the Governor-General of the Dominion of New Zealand
Neil Morrison Macfarlane  Principal Medical Officer, Basutoland

Colonies, Protectorates, etc
Major Albert Abramson  District Commissioner, Northern District, Palestine
Harold Thomas Creasy  Director of Public Works, Hong Kong
Charles Kenneth Dain, Treasurer and Controller of the Savings Bank, Uganda
Lieutenant-Colonel Albert Ernest Gallagher  Chief Commandant of Police and Inspector of Prisons, Cyprus
William Marshall Philip  lately Medical Officer of Health, Colombo Municipal Council, Ceylon
John Powter, Director of Government Railways, Jamaica
Song Ong Siang, Unofficial Member of the Legislative Council of the Straits Settlements
Arthur Lionel Forster Smith  Inspector General of Education, Iraq
George Moody Stuart, for services in connection with the Imperial College of Tropical Agriculture
Edward Samuel Bourn Tagart, Secretary for Native Affairs, Northern Rhodesia
Howard Mark Woolley, lately Postmaster General, Nigeria
Charles Rufus Marshall Workman, Colonial Secretary, Gambia

Honorary Commanders

Officer of the Order of the British Empire (OBE)

Military Division
Royal Navy
Commander Ernie William Money 
Commander Thomas Parkinson, (retired)
Engineer-Commander John Wisdom 
Surgeon-Commander Guy Leslie Buckeridge
Paymaster Lieutenant Frederick Robert Joseph Mack 
Commander Ernest Edkin 

Army
Major Alan Sauer Auret, 3rd Battalion, 10th Baluch Regiment (Queen Mary's Own), Indian Army
Quartermaster and Captain Roderick Bailhe  Royal Artillery
Captain Richard George Forfeitt Beale, 6th Battalion, The Devonshire Regiment, Territorial Army
Lieutenant-Colonel Walter Strickland Beamish, Royal Artillery, Assistant Director of Equipment and Ordnance Stores, Army Headquarters, India
Matron
Maud Mary Blakely  Queen Alexandra's Imperial Military Nursing Service
Major Gustavus Glyn Spieker Brander, The Suffolk Regiment, late attached Sudan Defence Force
Captain John Cabel Bray, 46th (North Midland) Divisional Signals, Royal Corps of Signals, Territorial Army
Major Noel Gordon Monad Browne, Staff Officer, Department of the Adjutant General of the Australian Military Forces
Quartermaster and Major Ernest George Butler  Retired Pay, County Recruiting Officer, Newcastle-on-Tyne
Major Iltyd Nicholl Clayton, Royal Artillery, Chief Instructor and Staff Officer, Artillery, Iraq Army
Lieutenant-Colonel Walter Cooper  63rd (6th London) Field Brigade, Royal Artillery, Territorial Army
Captain Reginald Charles Cummings, 43rd (Wessex) Divisional Signals, Royal Corps of Signals, Territorial Army
The Reverend Henry Peverley-Dodd, Chaplain to the Forces, Senior Wesleyan Chaplain, Aldershot Command
Captain Noel Walter Eastwood, 3rd The King's Own Hussars, attached Sudan Defence Force
Major Charles Morgan Finny  Royal Army Medical Corps
Captain and Brevet Major William Alexander Lovat-Fraser, 4th (Prince of Wales's Own) Battalion, 8th Punjab Regiment, Indian Army, Brigade Major, Military Forces, Iraq
Captain Alfred Joseph Gatt  Royal Malta Artillery
Staff Paymaster and Major Harry Golding, Royal Army Pay Corps
Major Vernon Robert Guise  Royal Artillery, lately attached Iraq Levies
Captain Herle Maudslay Hordern  Royal Artillery
Captain Eric Harold Howe, Indian Army Remount Department, District Remount Officer, Montgomery Area, India
Captain Stanley Woodburn Kirby  Royal Engineers
Lieutenant-Colon el Robert Godfrey Llewellyn  53rd (Welsh) Divisional Signals, Royal Corps of Signals, Territorial Army
Major Alan Joseph McCarraher, Postal Section, Royal Engineers, Supplementary Reserve
Captain James Eben McConnell, The Seaforth Highlanders (Rossshire Buffs, The Duke of Albany's)
Major Eric Debonnair Theophilus Metcalfe  Indian Army Service Corps, Deputy Assistant Director, Mechanical Transport, Army Headquarters, India
Captain William Edward Cuming Moore, Royal Army Ordnance Corps
Major and Brevet Lieutenant-Colonel John Hugh Morris  Royal Army Service Corps
Lieutenant-Colonel Leonard Lachlan Porter  The Nilgiri Malabar Battalion, Auxiliary Force, India
Lieutenant James Malcolm Leslie Renton  The Rifle Brigade (Prince Consort's Own), lately serving with the local rank of major, as Deputy Assistant Adjutant-General, Iraq Levies
Major Robert Noel Girling Scott, 4th Battalion, 15th Punjab Regiment, Indian Army; Officer-in-Charge Intelligence Bureau, Baluchistan District, India
Quartermaster and Major Herbert Simpson  Extra Regimentally Employed List, Private Secretary to the Adjutant General, War Office
Major John Heatley Spencer  Royal Army Medical Corps
Captain George Alexander Neville Swiney  Royal Army Ordnance Corps, Adjutant, Depot, Royal Army Ordnance Corps
Quartermaster and Lieutenant-Colonel Gwynne Cecil Thomas  Extra Regimentally Employed List, Quartermaster and Adjutant, The Duke of York's Royal Military School
Quartermaster and Captain Thomas George Upton  11th Hussars (Prince Albert's Own)
Major John Raymond Warren  4th Battalion, The Royal Sussex Regiment
Territorial Army
Captain Alfred Edward Williams, 1st Battalion, The Great Indian Peninsular Railway Regiment, Auxiliary Force, India
Captain Harold Williamson  Indian Medical Service
Lieutenant-Colonel Hugh Wilson, 55th (Northumbrian) Medium Brigade, Royal Artillery, Territorial Army

Royal Air Force
Squadron Leader Arthur Travers Harris  
Squadron Leader Arthur Trafalgar Williams
Squadron Leader William Boston Cushion

Civil Division

James William Allen  For services to the Prize Court Registry
Franklyn Leslie Barnard  Pilot under Imperial Airways Ltd
Henry Cecil Boys  Assistant Superintendent of Design Royal Arsenal, Woolwich
Oswald Edward Beecher Brigden, M District Auditor, Ministry of Health
Elizabeth Miriam Burgwin. For services to Education
James Thomas Burns, Chief Officer of the Birkenhead Fire Brigade
Major Frederick Lawrence Stanley Clarke, Chief Constable of Gloucestershire
James Cook, Principal, Board of Customs and Excise
William Walter Coombs  Chief Clerk, Companies Department, Board of Trade
George Frederick Cotton  Principal Admiralty
Henry Albert Cox, Education Officer, Air Ministry
John Crompton. For service to textile education.
Charles Francis Wolley-Dod. Pilot under Imperial Airways Ltd.
Henry Richard Evans, For public services.
William Anthony Faux. Chairman of the Salford Local Employment Committee
Walter Ernest Ferguson. Senior Inspector, Board of Inland Revenue
Macleod Barker Frere, Clerk of Accounts, Metropolitan Police Office
Henry William-Garrett, Principal, India Office
James Stanley Pool Godsell  Principal, Ministry of Transport
William Gordon, Chief Constable of Dumfriesshire
Richard John Halford  Chief Superintendent, City of London Police
Major Bernard Charles Hartley, Secretary of the Army Sports Central Board
Alfred Hawkins. For public services.
Joseph Cornelius Holmes. For public services.
Herbert John Hutchinson, Principal, Board of Trade
Robert Jackson, Secretary to the British Trawlers Federation
Thomas Johnson, H.M. Inspector of Elementary Schools
Ernest Livingstone Johnston  Assistant Royal Airship Works, Cardington
Lieutenant-Colonel Albert George Lee  Staff Engineer, General Post Office
Sydney Walter-Herbert Long. For public services.
John James Moynihan, Divisional Inspector, Ministry of Health
Eliza Grace Musgrove, Matron of the Devon County Mental Hospital
Frank Pacy, City Librarian of Westminster, Secretary of the Library Association
William Dawson Paterson, Assistant Chief Constable, Edinburgh City Police Force
Major Rupert Ernest Penny, Principal Technical Officer, Air Ministry
Thomas Joseph Pey, Chief Constable of Wigan
James Pimlott, Chief Inspector, Ministry of Agriculture, Northern Ireland
Frank Popplewell, Secretary of Trade Boards, Ministry of Labour
Victor Edward Pullin  Director of Radiological Research, War Office
Francis William Purssell  Commandant, Metropolitan Special Constabulary, Reserve
William McCulloch Ramsay  For services to Education in Edinburgh
Nicholas Serge Reyntiens, Assistant Director, Department of Overseas Trade
Lawrence Richmond, Clerk to the Sheffield Board of Guardians
Hugh Roberts, Member of the Carnarvon Insurance Committee
Elizabeth Sanday, Woman Superintendent, Accountant General's Department, General Post Office
Richard Jefferson Simpson, Principal, Ministry of Health
Frederick Harry Stafford, Secretary of the Worcester Training Ship
Ethel Steel  Lady Principal, Royal School for Officers Daughters, Bath
Leo Taylor, Chief Commoner of the Corporation of the City of London
Henry Vincent Victor Thompson, Principal, Ministry of Finance, Northern Ireland
Edward Trotter For public services.
Philip Corbett Turnbull, Commander, Metropolitan Special Constabulary
Alexander Turner For public services.
George Herbert Valentine  Divisional Commander, City of London Special Constabulary
John Waller  Assistant Chief Constable of Durham
Robert William Wharhirst, Superintendent of Armament Supply, Admiralty
Arthur Stuart Williams, Chief Constable of Sussex West

In recognition of the conspicuous ability and courage displayed by the under-mentioned Officers of the S.S. Sunning in recovering their vessel which had been captured by pirates off the coast of China on 15 November 1926 —

Thomas Parke Beatty, Chief Officer
Joseph William Hurst, Second Officer

British India
Thomas Forster Main, Deputy Director of Agriculture, Bombay
Hasan Suhrawardy, Major, Indian Territorial Force Medical Corps, Medical Practitioner, Bengal
Cecil Douglas Rae, Presidency Postmaster, Calcutta
Commander William Lamb Kelly  (retired), Personal Assistant to the Presidency Port Officer, and Agent for Government Consignments, Madras
Captain Mahomed Fazal-ud-Din, Indian Medical Service, Agency Surgeon at Jandola, South Waziristan
John Slattery, Assistant Inspector-General, Government Railway Police, Punjab
Herbert James Mitchell, Burma Frontier Service
Albin Richard Rebello, Assistant Accountant General, Punjab
Richard Wybrants Coryton, Superintendent, Governor's Estates, Bengal
Frank Ludlow, lately Head Master, Tibetan School, Gyantse
Sardar Bahadur Jiwan Singh, Honorary Magistrate, Padhana District, Lahore
The Reverend Thomas Watson Gardiner, Principal of the Hislop College, Nagpur, and Chairman of the Nagpur Mission Council of the United Free Church of Scotland
Khan Bahadur Qaai Khalil-ud-Din Ahmad, Dewan, Bijawar State, Bundelkhand, Central India

Diplomatic Service and Overseas List
Robert Vickers Bardsley  Deputy Governor, Blue Nile Province
Laurence Bolton, Chief Town Surveyor, Khartoum
Geoffrey Bramall, District Traffic Manager of Sudan Government Railways
Henry William Burnett  Vice-Consul at Maldonado
William Peter Dunham Clarke, Assistant Financial Secretary (Second), Sudan Government
George Norman Croker  Deputy Chief Engineer, Sudan irrigation Department
George Walter Grabham, Government Geologist, Khartoum
Cedric Vincent Wild Grose, Head Master, English School, Cairo
The Reverend Wilfred Langton Kissack  late Consul for Surinam and French Guiana
Edmund Lloyd  Church Missionary Society, Sudan
Walter Randolph Lucas Bey  Governor of Tura Prison, Egyptian Government
Austin William Medley, British Expert to Japanese Ministry for Foreign Affairs
Major John James Munro, Deputy Inspector-General of Telegraphs, Egyptian Government
Alwyne George Neville Ogden, Acting Consul at Kiukiang
Robert Parr, British Vice-Consul at Damascus
Charles Henry Saxby, of Messrs. Lawrence and Mayo, Opticians, Cairo
Macduff Frederick Simpson, Controller of Secondary Education, Egyptian Government
William Percy Whitford Turner, Acting Consul and Legation Accountant at Peking

Dominions
Frederick Hugh Dutton, Director of Education, Basutoland
Alice Mabel Maud Emmerton, of Melbourne, in recognition of charitable and social services in the State of Victoria

Colonies, Protectorates, etc.
Harold Bruce Gardiner Austin, Member of the House of Assembly and President of the Education Board, Barbados, represented Barbados at the West Indies Conference
Arthur William Bluck, Assistant Judge of the Supreme Court, Member of the House of Assembly, Bermuda
Katherme Hyde Bourne; in recognition of her public and social services in Jamaica
Thomas Gordon Buckley, District Officer, Tanganyika Territory
Attilio Critien  Chief Government Medical Officer and Superintendent of Public Health, Malta
Robert Edward Harold Crosbie, Assistant District Commissioner, Southern District, Palestine
Dimitrios Nicholas Dimitriou, Member of the Executive Council of Cyprus, and President of the Municipal Council of Larnaca
Charlotte Elizabeth Ferguson-Davie  recognition of her services in the Straits Settlements
Thomas Fitzgerald, Postmaster General, Kenya Colony
Richard Wolfe Gordon, District Officer, Tanganyika Territory
Daniel Meinerts Hahn  Assistant Director of Public Works, Trinidad
Bertram Evelyn Hanson, lately Auditor, Nigeria
Walter Frederick Hedges  Chief Architect, Public Works Department, Gold Coast Colony
John Bruce Howell, Manager of the Government Savings Bank, Barbados
Seymour Wylde Howes, Unofficial Member.of the Executive Council, Montserrat, in recognition of his services to the Government of Montserrat
William Joseph Johnson, Deputy Treasurer, Palestine
E'udblf Franz Mayer, Chief Proprietor of The East African Standard, in recognition of his services to Kenya Colony
Edward Ebbert Mifsud  Private Secretary to the Governor of Malta and Clerk of the Executive Council, Nominated Council and Privy Council of the Island
John Randall Phillips  Senior Member of the Legislative Council of Barbados
John Prichard, President of the Court of First Instance, Baghdad, Iraq
Edward Keith Roach, Deputy District, Commissioner Jerusalem District, Palestine
George Freeman Royds, Director-General, Tapu Department, Iraq
Joseph Mario Smith, Chief Veterinary Officer, Palestine
Ho Kom-tong, for public and charitable services in the Colony of Hong Kong
John Frederick Wilkins, Deputy Inspector General of Police, Iraq
Herbert Pinckney Winslow, Manager of the British Section of the Kowloon-Canton Railway, Hong Kong
Haji Hafiz Mehmed Ziauddin, the Mufti of Cyprus

Member of the Order of the British Empire (MBE)

Military Division
Royal Navy
Ordnance-Lieutenant Alexander Humphrey Workman
Lieutenant Samuel George Davis
Engineer-Lieutenant Percy Robert Brooker
Paymaster-Lieutenant Arthur George Webley
Headmaster Arthur William Holland
Lieutenant William Edward Petley 

Army
Regimental Quartermaster Sergeant Albert Aston, Grenadier Guards
Sergeant Major Artillery Clerk Alfred Ernest Ball, Royal Artillery
Lieutenant George Francis Bancroft, Royal Army Ordnance Corps
Warrant Officer Class I Bandmaster William Bartlett, 2nd Battalion, The Gordon Highlanders
Quartermaster and Lieutenant William George Laurence Beattie, The Argyll and Sutherland Highlanders (Princess Louise's)
Regimental Sergeant-Major Joseph Bradburn, Royal Army Service Corps
Staff Sergeant-Major Walter John Brooks  Royal Army Service Corps
Assistant Commissary and Lieutenant John Bryce, Indian Miscellaneous List, Superintendent, Headquarters, Western Command, India
Lieutenant John Leitch Charman, Army Educational Corps
Conductor Harry Alfred Clarke, Indian Army Service Corps
Regimental Sergeant-Major Reginald William Cole, Royal Army Medical Corps
Quartermaster and Captain James Connor, Royal Army Service Corps
Assistant Commissary and Lieutenant Albert Cook, Indian Army Ordnance Corps
Lieutenant William Harry Noel Dent, Royal Corps of Signals, Iraq Signal Section
Superintending Clerk Edward James Drumm, Royal Engineers
Company Sergeant-Major John Ferguson, The Gordon, Highlanders, attached Sudan Defence Force
First Class Staff Sergeant-Major Archibald William Flood, Ebyal Army Service Corps
Lieutenant James Stead Garrett, 4th (Prince of Wales's Own) Battalion, 8th Punjab Regimerit, Indian Army
Lieutenant Walter Bramwell Valder Henry Paul Gates, Royal Army Service Corps
Sister Winifred Mary Gedye  Queen Alexandra's Imperial Military Nursng Service
Quartermaster and Captain George Giddens, 8th (Isle of Wight Rifles, Princess
Beatrice's) Battalion, The Hampshire Regiment, Territorial Army
Quartermaster and Lieutenant Albert Gill, 2nd Battalion, The South Staffordshire Regiment
Sub Assistant Surgeon Subadar Gurditt Singh, Indian Medical Department
First Class Staff Sergeant-Major William Joseph Hart, Royal Army Service Corps
Quartermaster Sergeant Instructor Ernest Humphries, Gunnery School, Royal Tank Corps
Conductor Saville Britain Jackson, Indian Miscellaneous List, Superintendent, Adjutant General's Branch, Army Headquarters, India
Conductor Thomas Morland Johnson, Indian Army Ordnance Corps
Regimental Sergeant-Major Alexander John Keen, Army Physical Training Staff, Army School of Physical Training, Ambala, India
Company Sergeant-Major Joseph Robert Kilgour  5th Battalion, The Durham Light Infantry, Territorial Army
Staff Sergeant-Major Percy George Lomax, Royal Army Service Corps
Captain John Alexander Longmore, 1st Battalion, The Hertfordshire Regiment, Territorial Army
Company Sergeant-Major Alpiri Macgregor, The Gordon Highlanders, lately local Regimental Sergeant-Major, Iraq Levies
Captain Cuthbert David Marley, 5th Battalion, The Durham Light Infantry, Territorial Army Deputy, Commissary and Captain Percy
Harold Marshall, Indian Miscellaneous List, Superintendent General Staff Branch, Army Headquarters, India
Veterinary Assistant Surgeon Noor Mohamed, 2nd Cavalry Regiment;, Iraq Levies
Lieutenant Ernest Vincent Packer, Regular Army Reserve of Officers, The Essex Regiment, lately serving with the local rank of captain, as Adjutant, 1st Battalion, Iraq Levies, and now attached Iraq Army
Quartermaster and Lieutenant Arthur Pugh  2nd Battalion, The Royal Scots (The Royal Regiment)
Quartermaster and Lieutenant Joseph Edward Pugh, Royal Army Medical Corps
Captain Arthur Maxwell Ramsden, 8th Battalion, The West Yorkshire Regiment (The Prince of Wales's Own), Territorial Army
Lieutenant Wilford Norman Reeve  4th/7th Dragoon Guards, Assistant Controller of Labour, British Army of the Rhine
Captain William Herbert Ridgewell, 5th Battalion, The Bedfordshire and Hertfordshire Regiment, Territorial Army
Regimental Quartermaster-Sergeant Robert Rowan  9th (Glasgow Highlanders) Battalion, The Highland Light Infantry (City of Glasgow Regiment), Territorial Army
Lieutenant Albert Rumbelow, The Suffolk Regiment
First Class Staff Sergeant-Major Arthur John Ryan  Royal Army Service Corps
Jemadar Sayed Gul Akber Shah, Sub Assistant Surgeon, 2nd Cavalry Regiment, Iraq Levies
Quartermaster and Captain Gilbert Scofield, 1st Battalion, The Royal Welsh Fusiliers
Lieutenant Raja Sher Muhammad Khan, 1st Battalion, 15th Punjab Regiment, Indian Army
Quartermaster and Lieutenant Francis John Snell, 4th Battalion, The Somerset Light Infantry (Prince Albert's), Territorial Army
Sub Conductor Francis William Speare, Indian Miscellaneous List
Company Sergeant-Major Robert Stuart, The Seaforth Highlanders (Rossshire Buffs, The Duke of Albany's) attached The Lovat's Scouts, Territorial Army
Quartermaster and Captain Charles Starkey Sykes, Royal Engineers
Staff Sergeant-Major Herbert Tovell, Royal Army Service Corps
Quartermaster and Lieutenant Ernest John Meno Van Walwyk  28th London Regiment, Territorial Army
Regimental Sergeant-Major John George Venning, attached Iraq Levies
Captain William Warr, 48th (South Midland) Divisional Engineers, Royal Engineers, Territorial Army
Company Sergeant-Major Harold Wheeler, The Worcestershire Regiment, Senior Officers School, Belgaum, India
Company Sergeant-Major Cyril Arthur George Wilde, attached Iraq Levies
Assistant Surgeon Henry Carlyle William Windsor, Indian Medical Department

Royal Air Force
Flying Officer Allan Lanman 
Flying Officer Graham Stuart Smith
Flying Officer Frank Henry Whitmore 
Sergeant-Major William Webster

Civil Division

Millicent Fanny, Amor, Headmistress, St. Pancras Church Girls School
William George Appleyard, Superintendent, Middlesbrough Special Constabulary
Frederick John Barton, Local Accountant, Ministry of Labour
Kate Barnard Blaikley, Accounting Clerk and Lady Superintendent, Imperial War Graves Commission
Thomas Davidson Boyd For public services.
Richard Bradshaw, Clerk, Royal Arsenal, Woolwich
Walter Henry Brett, Superintendent, Sussex (West) Constabulary
Charles Strutton Brookes, Food Inspector, Port of Harwich
Augustus Tares Clarke Campbell, Superintendent, Derbyshire Constabulary
Thomas Carruthers, Superintendent, Durham Constabulary
Captain John Edward Carter, Ex-Soldier Clerk, War Office
George Henry Chapman, Superintending Clerk, War Office
Richard Clayton, Chief Clerk to the Commandant, Royal Military College, Sandhurst
Major Richard Charles Cole  Commander, Honourable Artillery Company Division, Metropolitan Special Constabulary, Reserve
John William Connaway, Waterguard Superintendent, 1st Class, Board of Customs and Excise
Bridie Maureen Copeland, Sister, Kent County Mental Hospital
Violet Caulfeild Cottell, Superintendent, Secretary of State's Clerical Staff, Foreign Office
George Cox, Collector, Board of Inland Revenue
Joseph Cravos, Superintendent, Cardiff Special Constabulary
James Crawford, Superintendent of Lithography, General Staff, War Office
John William Critchley  Rector of Dumfries Academy
Mary Cudworth, Member of the York, Selby and District War Pensions Committee
John William Davidson, Senior Staff Clerk, Ministry of Health
John Davies, Superintendent, Glamorgan Constabulary
Lawrence Victor Dawe, Commandant, Metropolitan Special Constabulary
Paymaster Commander James Godfrey Dendy  Senior Chief Superintendent, Mercantile Marine Office, Board of Trade
William Duffus, Superintendent, Ayrshire Constabulary
Captain Richard Embleton  Inspector, Newcastle Special Constabulary
Adolphus Sydney Francis, Superintendent, Essex Special Constabulary
Robert Gardiner, Superintendent, Durham Constabulary
George Goodchild, Clerk and Steward, Hertford County Mental Hospital
Robinett Grandy, Collector, Board of Inland Revenue
Charles William Grant, Principal Foreman of Storehouses, Admiralty
Herbert William Gunston, Headmaster, Long Ashton School, Somerset
William Thomas Hall, Chief Clerk in the Prison Commission
William John Harris, Civil Assistant, Royal Air Force Stores, Kidbrooke
John Frederick Hayes For public services.
John Hepworth, Assistant Accountant, Ministry of Health
Edward John Hill, Late Warship Production Superintendent, Admiralty
Frederick Newman Hoare, Staff Clerk, Ministry of Labour
Samuel John Holloway, Postmaster of Bromley and Beckenham
Major Edward Marshall Holmes  Sheffield Special Constabulary
Flight Lieutenant (retd.) Frederick James Hooper, Technical Officer, Royal Aircraft Establishment
Thomas West Horton, Superintendent, West Riding of Yorkshire Constabulary
Edward Harold Howell, Clerk for Legal Instruments, Colonial Office
David Hutchinson, Superintendent, Northumberland Constabulary
Flora Elizabeth Jefferies, Member of the Southend-on-Sea War Pensions Committee
George Ernest Johnson, Chief Superintendent, Bradford City Police
George Oxton Kirkham Jones, Headmaster, Tennyson Street Council School, Battersea
George Ernest Kendall  Assistant Architect, Board of Education
William George Kershaw  Senior Sanitary Inspector under the Hampstead Metropolitan Borough Council
Claude Henry Klyne, Assistant Electrical Engineer, Admiralty
Joseph George Lansberry, Superintendent, Manchester City Police
Arthur Samuel George Lovell, Superintendent, Dorsetshire Police
Sarah Lovell, Head Nurse, London County Mental Hospital, Claybury
Mildred Shirley Lowe, Superintendent Health Visitor and Inspector of Midwives in Warwickshire
Charles George Maby, Superintendent, Bristol City Police
William John McCaghey, Deputy Chief Inspector, Ministry of Labour, Northern Ireland
Patrick Joseph McGlade, late Senior Inspector, Ministry of Education, Northern Ireland
William Millerchip  Manager, Vauxhall Employment Exchange
Joan Mitchell, Higher Executive Officer, Ministry of Health
Thomas Mitchell, Staff Officer, Board of Inland Revenue
William Charles George Moger, Higher Executive Officer, Ministry of Pensions
Annie Newman, Head Nurse, London County Mental Hospital, Horton
Edward William Norris. For public services.
John Walker Oldfield, H.M. Inspector (Immigration), Home Office
James Orton, Superintendent, Metropolitan Police
Mildred Florence Paget, Clerk in the Foreign Office
John Palmer. For public services. 
Bertram Park, Commandant, Metropolitan Special Constabulary
Reginald Thomas Parkin, Assistant Director, Passport Control Department, Foreign Office
Henrietta Peeke, Headmistress, Church Girls School, Hadleigh, West Suffolk
John Lewis Rees, Superintendent, Glamorgan Constabulary
John Ross, Deputy, Chief Constable and Superintendent, Ross and Cromarty Constabulary
Dane Wilding Salter, Deputy Victualling Store Officer, Admiralty
Mary Gaskell Seed, Superintendent Health Visitor, Manchester
John Francis Shelswell, Superintendent, Gloucestershire Constabulary
Benjamin Skinner, Headmaster of Strichen Higher Grade Public School
Georgie May Smith  General Secretary, Official Medical History of the War
Vera Alexandra Paton-Smith, a Controller of Women's Staff, General Staff, War Office
Walter James Smith, Senior Staff Officer, Board of Trade
Lawrence Hubert Spendlove, Superintendent, Monmouthshire Constabulary
George Arthur Grantham Stanley
Senior Staff Officer, Board of Trade
Frances Stevenson, Chief Superintendent of Typists, Board of Customs and Excise
Harry Rawlings Taylor, Accountant, Ministry of Labour
Willie Taylor, Member of Chester, Runcorn and District War Pensions Committee
Francis Tucker, Chief Superintendent, Staffordshire Constabulary
Percival Ernest Wagstaff, Head of the Bethnal Green Men's Institute
John Randle Walker  Assistant Registrar-General, Northern Ireland
Prank Llewellyn Warren, Divisional Commander, City of London Special Constabulary
William Henry Welsh, Superintendent, Lanarkshire Constabulary
Edward Wheeler, Technical Assistant, Directorate of Artillery, War Office

In recognition of the conspicuous ability and courage displayed by the under-mentioned Officer of the S.S. Sunning in recovering their vessel which had been captured by pirates off the coast of China on 15 November 1926 —

George Cormack, Chief Engineer

British India
Captain Francis Maxwell-Lawford, Administrative Commandant, Madras University Training Corps
Honavar Harischandra, Deputy Superintendent of Police, Bombay
Felix Lawrence Newman, Deputy Superintendent of Police, Punjab
William Benham Moorman, Superintendent, Quartermaster-General's Branch, Army Headquarters
William John Rades, Superintendent, Military Secretary's Branch, Army Headquarters
Pestonji Bezonji TaJati, Advocate, Government Pleader, Dehra Dun, United Provinces
Purushottama Padmanabha Pillai, Member of the League of Nations Secretariat, Geneva
George Edwin Moore, Extra Assistant to His Majesty's Consul for Sistan and Kain, East Persia
Joseph Balthazar de Silva  Superintendent, Office of the Military Secretary to His Excellency the Governor of Bombay
Edwin Alfred John Barnes, Senior Inspector, Harbour Police, Aden. Claude Stanley Ricketts, Personal Stenographer to His Excellency the Viceroy
James Eyan, Secretary, Upper India Chamber of Commerce, Cawnpore
Peter Sydenham Paulit, late Assistant Registrar, English Office, High Court, Calcutta
Edith, Lady Heald, Rangoon
Helen King, Bengal
Kobad Dhunjibhai Mugaseth, Medical
Practitioner, Calicut, Madras

Diplomatic Service and Overseas List
Ewen Campbell  Assistant District Commissioner, Sudan Government
Hilda Conquest, Private Secretary to Financial Adviser, Egyptian Government
Samuel James Dawson, Superintendent of Soldiers and Sailors Institute, Alexandria
William Seymour Dean, Inspector of Customs, Sudan Government
Angus Faulkner, Vice-Consul at Croix
Leveson Gerrish, Finance Inspector, Sudan Government
Agnes Gibson, Head Mistress of Scottish School for Girls, Alexandria
John Edwin Harris, Inspector of Surveys, Sudan Government
Joseph Tetley Hirst, Manager, Gordon College Instructional Workshops, Khartoum
Walter Frederick James, Pro-Consul at British Consulate-General at New York
John Joannidis, Vice-Consul, Laurium, Greece
Herbert Montague Johnson, Assistant Telegraph Engineer, Sudan Telegraphs
Captain Herbert Frederick Kidd, Assistant District Commissioner, Sudan Political Service
Harriet Lassell, Matron of Kasr el Aini Hospital, Cairo
John Manly Lee, Assistant District Commissioner, Sudan Government
Raleigh le May, British Consul at Memel
Frederick Sampson Sillitoe, Superintendent of Government Gardens, Khartoum
Sidney Duncan Stowe, Mercantile Marine Service, Board of Trade, acting British Vice-Consul at Port Said
William Edward Laxton Sweet, Manager of Rengo News Agency Office, London
Charles Edward Joseph Walkley, Inspector, Civil Department, Sudan Government

Colonies, Protectorates, etc
Robert Barker Crusher, Assistant Inspector, Department of Surveys, Palestine
Bertie Harry Easter, Headmaster of St. Mary's College, St. Lucia, for services in combatting the recent fire at Castries, St. Lucia
Frank Tate Ellis, lately Headmaster, Bishop Gobat's School, Jerusalem
Samuel John Forster, Unofficial Member of the Legislative Council of the Gambia
Joseph Trousell Gilbert, First Assistant Secretary and Clerk of Councils, Zanzibar
George William Hatchell, District Officer, Tanganyika Territory
John Marcus Knight, Chief Clerk in the Office of the Governor of the Windward Islands, Clerk to the Executive Council of, the Island of Grenada
Major Charles Lionel Grey Matthews Matthews-Donaldson, Aide-de-Camp and Private Secretary to the Governor of the Windward Islands, for services in combatting the recent fire at Castries, St. Lucia
Robert Moffatt, Assistant Engineer, Posts and Telegraphs Department, Palestine
Oliver Nugent, lately Additional Magistrate and Deputy Coroner, Antigua, Leeward Islands
Antoni Papapetrou, Assistant. Registrar-General, Land Registration and Survey Department, Cyprus
Charlotte Harriet Pidsley, Principal of the Annie Walsh Memorial School, Freetown, Sierra Leone
Captain Frederick Brooke Sharp, Inspector of Police; St. Lucia, for service in combatting the recent fire at Castries, St. Lucia
Alfred Thomas Sumner, Senior Master, Njala Agricultural College, Sierra Leone

Honorary Members
Matheus Placido da Costa, Head Asiatic
Clerk in the Secretariat, Uganda. Zaki Hadefi, Mayor of Tiberias, Palestine
Ahmad Effendi Khaledi, Principal of the Men's Training College, Department of Education, Palestine
Shawki Effendi Fatallah Saad, Assistant Superintendent of Police, Palestine
Samuel Tolkowsky, of Tel Aviv, Palestine, in recognition of his public services.

Members of the Order of the Companions of Honour (CH) 

The Reverend John Daniel Jones  Chairman of the Congregational Union of England and Wales, 1909–10 and 1925–26

Royal Red Cross (RRC) 
Second Classi
In recognition of-the special devotion and competency displayed by them in their nursing duties with the British Forces in Iraq
Emily de la Hoyde, Matron, Indian Nursing Service
Catherine Annie Waugh, Nursing Sister, Indian Nursing Service

Kaisar-i-Hind Medal
First Class
The Reverend Caleb Davies, Medical Superintendent, Sonthal Mission Hospital, Sarenga, Bankura, Bengal
Ethel Adelaide Douglas  Medical Officer in charge of the Kinnaird Women's Hospital, Lucknow
Doctor Carl Fredrik Kugelberg, Church of Sweden Mission, Tirupattur, Ramnad District, Madras
The Reverend David Beid Gordon, American Presbyterian Mission, Gurdaspur District, Punjab
The Reverend Luigi Carlo Perfumi, Church Missionary Society, Muzaffarnagar, United Provinces
Mary Isabel Buddie, Madras
Bachel Piggott, Zenana Mission, Hyderabad, Sind, Bombay

British Empire Medal (BEM)

Military Division

For Meritorious Service
Sapper John Wilfred Archer, Royal Engineers
Corporal Henry Bellringer, Royal Corps of Signals
Sergeant Walter Thomas Bristow, 19th (Survey) Company, Royal Engineers
Company Sergeant-Major Dan Daura, late Nigeria Regiment, West African Frontier Force
Sergeant Harry Sandle, Royal Engineers
Sergeant George Wallace Hepple 
Corporal William Joshua Leslie Brown 
Aircraftman William Howson

Civil Division

For Meritorious Service
Edward Bastable, Chief Officer, Wandsworth Prison
Isaac Bayles, Constable, Durham Constabulary
Alan Bent, Inspector, Gloucestershire Constabulary
Robert Boone, Inspector, Manchester City Police
Sidney Clarke, Acting Sergeant, Glamorgan Constabulary
William Cooper, Sergeant, Lancashire Constabulary
John Gunn, Constable, Durham Constabulary
Thomas Egerton, Inspector, Lancashire Constabulary
Fadl Musa, Sergeant, Darfur Province Police
Frederick Norman Perry, Temp. Constable (First Reserve), Glamorgan Constabulary
David Tudor Picton, Acting Sergeant, Glamorgan Constabulary
Biehard Pryor, Inspector, Plymouth Police
William Edward Bees, Inspector, Glamorgan Constabulary
John Beid, Constable, Durham Constabulary
Mark Thompson, Inspector, Durham Constabulary
John Turner, Inspector, Derbyshire Constabulary
Edwin Walbyoff, Sergeant, Monmouthshire Constabulary
Elizabeth Kate Woods, Chief Officer, Holloway Prison
Alexander Young, Inspector, Northumberland Constabulary
George Woodworth, Sergeant, Lancashire Constabulary

Air Force Cross (AFC)

Bernard More Troughton Shute Leete, (Flying Officer, Reserve of Air Force Officers), in recognition of the distinguished service rendered to aviation by his recent flight in a light aeroplane from London to Delhi.
Flight Lieutenant Gerard Stephen Oddie 
Flying Officer Ardley George Pickering
Squadron Leader Harry George Smart 
Thomas Neville Stack (Flying Officer, Reserve of Air Force Officers), in recognition of the distinguished service rendered to aviation by his recent flight in a light aeroplane from London to Delhi.

Awarded a Bar to the Air Force Cross (AFC*)
Flight Lieutenant Ivor Ewing McIntyre  Royal Australian Air Force, in recognition of the distinguished services rendered on the recent seaplane flight from Melbourne to the British Solomon Islands and back.

Air Force Medal
Sergeant (Pilot) George Edward Lowdell
Corporal Leslie Joseph Trist, Royal Australian Air Force, in recognition of the distinguished services rendered on the recent seaplane flight from Melbourne to the British Solomon Islands and back.

Imperial Service Order (ISO)
Home Civil Service
William James Anderson, Staff Officer, British Museum
Arthur Carwithen, Principal Clerk, Paymaster-General's Office
Wallace John Elvy, Principal Ship Surveyor, Board of Trade
William Field, Clerk in Charge of Accounts, Civil Service Commission
David Frizzell, Accountant and Controller of the Finance of Local Education Schemes, Ministry of Education, Northern Ireland
Andrew Froude, Secretary and Chief Clerk, General Registry Office, Scotland
Ernest Leslie Holland, Senior Examiner, Estate Duty Office, Board of Inland Revenue
William Rees Jarman  Actuary, Government Actuary's Department
Claude Reynolds Leak, Principal, Ministry of Pensions
Charles William Lumley, Staff Clerk, Privy Council Office
Charles Henry William O'Brien  Registrar, Audit Department, National Insurance
Hugh Ritchie  Technical Assistant in Treaty Department, Foreign Office
John Sankey, First Class Officer, Employment and Insurance Branch, Ministry of Labour
Thomas Elias Tutton, Director, Investigation Department, General Post Office

Dominions
Charles Hay Dewhirst, Secretary to the Commissioner of Public Works and to the Minister of Railways, State, of South Australia
Frederick James Jones  Chairman of the Government Railway Board, Dominion of New Zealand
Edward Joseph Mulvany, Secretary to the Department of Markets and Migration, Commonwealth of Australia
Louis Edward Shapcott  Secretary of the Premier's Department and Chairman, of the State Gardens; Board, State of Western Australia

Indian Civil Service
John; Jebaratnam Hensman, Manager, Office of the University of Madras
Bhai Ram Dyal, Superintendent, Deputy Commissioner's Office, Gurdaspur, Punjab

Colonial Civil Service
Caddie Augustus Bartlett, lately Police Magistrate and Coroner, Barbados
Henry Dixon, Superintendent, Money Order Office, General Post Office, Hong Kong
Henry Alexander Martin, Accountant and Financial Assistant, Treasury, Ceylon
Charles James Perkins, Assistant Surveyor-General, Straits Settlements and Federated Malay States
John Henry Stanley Robbin, Chief Registrar of the Supreme Court, Nigeria

Imperial Service Medal (ISM)

Natha Jiva, Naik in the Office of the Executive Engineer, Kaira and Panch Mahals Division, Bombay

References

Birthday Honours
1927 awards
1927 in Australia
1927 in India
1927 in New Zealand
1927 in the United Kingdom